Perittia cygnodiella is a moth of the family Elachistidae. It is found from British Columbia and Alberta through Washington to California.

The length of the forewings is 3.5-5.5 mm. The forewings are gray with an elongate dark spot in the middle of the wing. This spot is surrounded by bluish-white scales, forming an irregular light patch. The hindwings are gray, basally often lighter.

References

Elachistidae
Moths described in 1921
Moths of North America
Taxa named by August Busck